Günter Reisch (24 November 1927 – 24 February 2014) was a German film director and screenwriter. He served in the German Army during the last stage of World War II. On 20 April 1944 he became a member of the Nazi Party. After his release from an American POW camp, he returned to Potsdam in the Soviet occupation zone and joined the Free German Youth and later the Socialist Unity Party of Germany.  He started working with theater and film and became one of East Germany's most prominent film makers. He made 20 films, including the two Karl Liebknecht films. His 1978 film Anton the Magician was entered into the 11th Moscow International Film Festival.

Selected filmography
 The Sailor's Song (1958)
 New Year's Eve Punch (1960)
 Ach du fröhliche... (1962)
 Anton the Magician (1978)
 The Fiancee (1979)

References

External links
 

1927 births
2014 deaths
Film people from Berlin
Nazi Party members
Socialist Unity Party of Germany members
German Army personnel of World War II
German prisoners of war in World War II held by the United States
Recipients of the National Prize of East Germany
Recipients of the Heinrich Greif Prize
Recipients of the Patriotic Order of Merit in gold